Het goudvischje is a 1919 Dutch silent drama film directed by Maurits Binger.

Cast
 Annie Bos - Greta Rikkers
 Jeanne Van der Pers - Het Goudvischje
 Lily Bouwmeester - Greta's zuster
 Paula de Waart - Mevrouw Koorders
 Adelqui Migliar - Herman Koorders
 Jan van Dommelen - Oude heer Rikkers
 Fred Penley - Oude procuratiehouder
 Yard Van Staalduynen
 Renee Spiljar

External links 
 

1919 films
Dutch silent feature films
Dutch black-and-white films
1919 drama films
Films directed by Maurits Binger
Dutch drama films
Silent drama films